Chak 217 GB (Urdu: چک نمبر ۲۱۷گ۔ب گجر پنڈ), or Gujjar Pind, is a suburban village of Tehsil Samundri in the District Faisalabad (Lyallpur) Punjab in Pakistan. The first known settlements in the village date between 1898 A.D. to 1920 A.D. The village comprises roughly 1,500 acres. Water is supplied by five irrigation channels, known locally as moga.  The Gogera Branch irrigation canal is abbreviated to GB and irrigates this specific area.

Neighboring villages are Chak No. 218 GB Vainspur to the east, Chak No. 213 GB Laadi Chak to the west, Chak No. 216 GB Jalalabad to the north, and Chak 478 & 475 GB Gidder Pindi to the southeast. Agriculture is the area's primary economic activity. Major crops (including wheat, sugarcane, corn, and cotton) are cultivated using old methods, resulting in poor yields.

Almost four generations have lived in the village since the first residents settled there between 1898 A.D and 1920 A.D. Before settlement, it was barren land called baar, a word which means "rain" in the Persian language. Water was supplied only by irrigation, and portable containers stored rainwater. There were three main baars in what is now the Punjab area. Chak 217 GB is in Saandal Baar, which is named after the grandfather of Abdullah Bhatti (Dulla Bhatti). Due to Sikh rule predating British rule in Punjab, most landlords were Sikhs, who held supremacy in the region.

The village is accessible by road from the Tehsil Samundari district, from the east, and the west. Samundari City is 14 km away from the village.

History
Agriculture land was allotted among peasant families from 1898 to 1920. In the local Punjabi language, Pind is the word for village. This village was numbered 217 of GB (the abbreviation of Gugera Branch Canal, a part of the Punjab Irrigation Department system developed by the British during their occupation from 1862 to 1898). The word Chak derived from Chak, a Sanskrit word denoting a circular demarcated piece of land. It may also relate to every village having a central well with a wooden circular lid (also called chak) on it.

Numberdars or Lambardars, or sub-administrators, who were appointed by the British Government during their rule, were awarded 12.5 or 25 acres of extra agricultural land called Lambar Dari Murruba. They used to bear official expenditures during officials' visits to the village on certain occasions or police officials during criminal investigations. Even today, these inactive posts are under their fourth generation with agricultural lands. In 1958, a grand mosque was built. The same year saw the first batch of four jawans recruited to the Pakistan army, as well as the imposition of martial law, by dictator Ayyub Khan. A substantial number of immigrants from the Indian Punjab migrated during the years 1947 to 1949, significantly increasing the population of the village. Relatives of immigrants who were present in the village provided shelter and food and shared their agricultural lands in a show of love and harmony during the hardship of this time.

There is a famous village fair, called (Urs), near Chak No. 217 GB, which takes place every year and starts on the ninth of February. For ancestors, this was the only recreational festival of the entire year. The Urs is a time to remember the teachings of a Sufi saint from almost a century ago.

Demographics
Most of the population here are Gujjars. Some emigrated from Hoshyarpur in 1898, during Sandal Bar colonization, and others mostly from 1947 to 1950, after the partition of India into India and Pakistan.

Some major sub-castes (or gotras) are Oddery, Lalwaan, Kissana, Khatana, Koli, and Chechi.

Earlier, during the settlement of agricultural lands, people lived with their livestock on their lands outside the village. Life was often strenuous for men and women alike. Women ordinarily woke early at dawn to grind the wheat for flour and were entirely responsible for the upkeep of the household and yard. Village women also churned yogurt to extract butter and buttermilk.

Further reading

References 

Villages in Faisalabad District